Henry (VII) (1211 – 12? February 1242), a member of the Hohenstaufen dynasty, was King of Sicily from 1212 until 1217 and King of Germany (formally Rex Romanorum) from 1220 until 1235, as son and co-ruler of Emperor Frederick II. He was the seventh Henry to rule Germany, but in order to avoid confusion with the Luxembourg emperor Henry VII, he is usually numbered Henry (VII).

Under custody
Henry was born in Sicily, the only son of King Frederick II and his first wife, Constance of Aragon. He was the elder brother of Conrad IV, who eventually succeeded him as king.

While Frederick sought to be elected German king against his Welf rival Otto IV, he had his new-born son crowned King of Sicily (as Henry II) by Pope Innocent III in March 1212, since an agreement between Frederick and the Pope stated that the kingdoms of Germany and Sicily should not be united under one ruler. For this, the regency of the Sicilian kingdom went to his mother Constance and not to his father. 

However, after the death of the Pope in 1216, Frederick called his son to Germany, entrusted him with the Duchy of Swabia, and again assumed the title of King of Sicily in 1217. Henry's mother remained as regent in Sicily, now on behalf of her husband, until 1220. After the extinction of the Swabian Zähringen line in 1219 Henry also received their title of a Rector of Burgundy, though that title disappeared when Henry was elected king.

On 20/26 April 1220, the German princes assembled at Frankfurt elected Henry King of the Romans, for which the Emperor issued Confoederatio cum principibus ecclesiasticis, favoring the prince-bishops. "The chief Princes present at Frankfort were the Archbishops of Mayence, Cologne, Treves, and Magdeburg, several Bishops, the Dukes of Bavaria and Brabant, the Landgrave of Thuringia, the Margraves of Namur and Baden, the Counts of Holland and Cleves, and the officials of Frederick's court." The election had been a condition to Frederick II redeeming his Crusade promises of 1215, because the succession question, in case of the emperor's death on the crusade, was clarified by them. However, Pope Honorius III did not recognize the election and also deprived Henry of his rights over the Sicilian kingdom, because he (just as his predecessor) wanted to prevent the union of both countries. Also, numerous German princes had rejected the election in the first moment.

After Frederick II returned to Italy in 1220, Henry was placed under the tutelage of Archbishop Engelbert I of Cologne, who crowned him German king on 8 May 1222, in Aachen. Despite the fact that Henry was formally betrothed to the Přemyslid princess Agnes of Bohemia, daughter of King Ottokar I of Bohemia, Engelbert planned his marriage with Isabella of England, one of the daughters of King John Lackland; however, this union never took place. After Engelbert's death in 1225, Duke Louis I of Bavaria took over the guardianship. The young King was mostly in the care of imperial ministeriales, like Conrad of Winterstetten. They also acted as administrators over his Swabian duchy. In the meanwhile, the betrothal between Henry and the Bohemian princess was cancelled.

In Nürnberg on 29 November 1225, by order of his father, Henry married Margaret of Babenberg, daughter of Duke Leopold VI of Austria, a woman seven years older than he was. Sixteen months later, on 23 March 1227, she was crowned German queen in Aachen. The marriage produced two sons, Henry and Frederick, who both died at a young age.

Henry seems to have been a lively, cultured ruler and kept many Minnesänger at his court. It is possible he wrote some Minnelieder (courtly love poetry) himself. He was physically robust, although lame, and about 1.66 m (5' 4½") tall.

Majority and rebellion against his father

In 1228, he had a falling-out with Duke Louis of Bavaria, who was suspected of plotting with Pope Gregory IX against Emperor Frederick II. Around Christmas of that year, Henry took over the rule for himself, forced Louis to submit, and then turned against the Bishop of Straßburg. The German princes, angered by his city-friendly policies, forced him however to issue in Worms on 1 May 1231 the Statutum in favorem principum, directed against the cities, and by their complaints turned Frederick II against his son. The emperor was dependent on the support of the princes for his Italian policies against the Pope. Among other things which augmented the discord between father and son, Frederick lifted several regulations Henry had stipulated during his minority years to reduce his authority, and on the other side, the elevation of the Swabian count Egeno V of Urach, a staunch enemy of the Emperor, who became the most important of Henry's advisers.

In 1232, Frederick came to terms with Pope Gregory, confirmed the Statutum, and had Henry swear obedience in Cividale. In the same year, Henry renewed the league between the Hohenstaufen and the French royal Capetian dynasty. In the following year he entered into a conflict with the House of Wittelsbach and subdued Otto II of the Palatinate, the son of Duke Louis of Bavaria. Frederick, fearing the discontent of the German princes, demanded the release of all hostages. In 1233/34, however, Henry made his father angry again, when he intervened against some inquisition measures, especially the Archbishop of Bremen's crusade against rebellious peasants of Stedingen. Pope Gregory IX, who had authorised the crusade, excommunicated Henry. Emperor Frederick outlawed his son on 5 July 1234 and announced his return to Germany.

Henry revolted and in September formed an alliance with several German bishops and Swabian nobles. However, further negotiations with King Louis IX of France and the Lombard League failed. The princes adopted a wait-and-see stance, while Henry's forces were stuck in fights with the Lords of Hohenlohe, Margrave Herman V of Baden, and the City of Worms. Emperor Frederick, once he had entered Germany, soon gained a large following. When both sides met in Swabia, Henry was forced to submit to his father on 2 July 1235 at Wimpfen Castle, forsaken by most of his followers. Frederick II and the princes tried Henry on 4 July 1235 in Worms and dethroned him. His sons were deprived of the succession jointly with him. Henry's younger brother Conrad was appointed Duke of Swabia instead and also elected King of the Romans.

Henry's allies were mostly pardoned. Frederick II reacted to the weakening of the royal power originated by his dispute with his son, among other things, with the diet in Mainz on 25 August 1235, which for first time passed a law on the public peace (German: Landfriedensgesetz) and fundamentally reformed the Regalia.

Imprisonment and death

Henry was kept prisoner in various places, first in Heidelberg and Alerheim Castle, later in Apulia and at Rocca San Felice in Campania. His seclusion may have been dictated as much by his health as by his rebelliousness: analysis of his skeleton in 1998–1999 has shown that he was suffering from advanced leprosy in his last years. This was perhaps the real cause which prevented the emperor from forgiving him.

Possibly on 12 February (according to other sources 10 February) 1242 Henry died near Martirano in Calabria after a fall from his horse when he was moved there from Nicastro. Some chroniclers report that it had been an attempted suicide. His father had him buried with royal honours in the cathedral of Cosenza, in an antique Roman sarcophagus.

Frederick, the only surviving son of Henry (VII), was named in the testament of his grandfather Frederick II, where the Emperor entrusted him with the Duchy of Austria, the Marquisate of Styria and 10,000 uncias. His death in 1251 was recorded by Matthew Paris, who claimed that both he and his older brother were poisoned (veneno interfecit).

Among the rulers of the Holy Roman Empire, Henry is numbered only in parentheses, as he did not exercise the sole kingship. He is not to be confused with the later emperor Henry VII who actually ruled the Empire from 1308 onwards. Long time in his father's shadow and disparaged as "Parentheses Henry", several historians in recent years have adopted a more positive view of his Hohenstaufen policies.

Ancestry

See also
Dukes of Swabia family tree

Notes

External links

Gino Fornaciari, The Leprosy of Henry VII (1211–1242), son of Frederick II and King of Germany.

1211 births
1242 deaths
13th-century Kings of the Romans
13th-century Kings of Sicily
Hohenstaufen
Dukes of Swabia
Nobility from Palermo
Deaths from leprosy
Medieval child monarchs
13th-century people of the Holy Roman Empire
Heirs apparent who never acceded
Children of Frederick II, Holy Roman Emperor
Sons of emperors